Luís Roberto Alves dos Santos Gavranić (born 23 May 1967) is a Mexican former professional footballer who played as a forward.

He is best known in Mexico as Zague, in honor to his father who was called the same and also played as a forward for Club América. Zague is the all-time top scorer for Club América.

Career
Born in Mexico, his father José Alves dos Santos was a Brazilian forward who played for Club América and his mother was a Croatian housewife. Zague spent his childhood in Brazil beginning his youth football career with Corinthians. He returned to Mexico in 1985 and made his debut with the Mexican Club América a year later.

On 2 October 2003, his testimonial game was celebrated at the Estadio Azteca where America would defeat FC Barcelona 2–0.

He was a physically strong and fast striker who was regarded as the best in his prime years for both América and Mexico. He was Hugo Sánchez`s strike partner in the Mexican side who finished as runner-up in Copa América 1993, where he finished up as Mexico's top goalscorer of the tournament.

He was part of the Mexico squad for the 1993 CONCACAF Gold Cup in which Mexico won the trophy and was the tournament top scorer with 11 goals which is still a CONCACAF record. Seven of those goals were scored against Martinique.

He scored 30 goals in 84 caps for his country.

In the Primera División de México he is the 7th highest goalscorer with 209 goals.

Since 2018, Zague is an analyst for TV Azteca, alongside Luis García and Jorge Campos.

Honours
América
Mexican Primera División: 1987–88, 1988–89
Campeón de Campeones: 1988, 1989
CONCACAF Champions' Cup: 1987, 1990, 1992
Copa Interamericana: 1990

Mexico
CONCACAF Gold Cup: 1993

Individual
CONCACAF Gold Cup top scorer: 1993
Club América All Time Leading Goalscorer

Career statistics

International goals

References

External links
International statistics at RSSSF.

1967 births
Living people
Mexican people of Brazilian descent
Mexican people of Croatian descent
Footballers from Mexico City
Association football forwards
Mexico international footballers
Club América footballers
Atlante F.C. footballers
Club Necaxa footballers
Liga MX players
1991 CONCACAF Gold Cup players
1993 Copa América players
1993 CONCACAF Gold Cup players
1994 FIFA World Cup players
1995 King Fahd Cup players
1995 Copa América players
CONCACAF Gold Cup-winning players
Mexican footballers